The Brethren Missionary Herald Company, also known as BMH Books, began in 1940 and is the publishing company serving the 1300 churches and approximately 3/4 of a million persons in the Charis Fellowship.  

Its main activities include:
 the publication of a denominational news publication, 
 the supplying of church resources through retail outlets, which are all now either sold or closed, 
 the publishing of books, often in 13-chapter formats and used widely by Grace Brethren churches as adult Sunday School curriculum..

BMH Books temporarily ceased publishing books in the late 1990s, but was restarted under a new board with Pastor Dan Thornton as chairman. BMH is run by its Executive Director Terry White and a new board elected in 2006.  Major networking takes place by means of a bi-monthly publication FGBC World and the official BMH Blog.

External links
BMH Books website
FGBC World website
BMH Editor's blog
FGBC Website

Christian publishing companies
Publishing companies of the United States
Publishing companies established in 1940